Young and Sexy is Canadian indie pop band from Vancouver consisting of vocalists Paul Pittman and Lucy Brain, guitarist André Lagacé, bassist Brent McDonald and former drummer Alex Brain. The band released four albums on Mint Records.

History
Young and Sexy was formed in 1998 in Vancouver. In 2002 they released their debut album, Stand Up For Your Mother. The band at that time included singers Paul Hixon Pittman and Lucy Brain, Ted Marcel Bois on keyboard and guitar, Andre J. Lagace on bass and guitar, and drummer Ron "Frankie" Teardrops.

In 2004 the group released their second album, Life Through One Speaker.  The album featured pop music and with harmonies and electric guitar riffs. Sales of the first two albums were moderate.

By the time the band's third album, Panic When You Find it, was released in 2006, Brent MacDonald was on bass, 
Legace played guitar, and Alex Brain had joined the band as drummer. A fourth album, The Arc, was released in 2008.

As of 2014, Young and Sexy continue to perform in the Vancouver area.

Discography
2002 Stand Up For Your Mother
2003 Life Through One Speaker
2006 Panic When You Find It
2008 The Arc

References

External links
 
 Young and Sexy at CBC Music
 CBC Radio 3 Studio Session "Melody Makers: Young and Sexy's Quest for Beauty"

Musical groups established in 1998
Musical groups from Vancouver
Canadian indie pop groups
Mint Records artists
1998 establishments in British Columbia